Jonathan Browning may refer to:
 Jonathan Browning (designer), American interior designer and business executive
 Jonathan Browning (inventor) (1805–1879), American inventor and gunmaker
 Jonathan Browning (UK businessman) (born 1959), president and CEO of Volkswagen Group of America

See also 
 John Browning (disambiguation)